
Gmina Kętrzyn is a rural gmina (administrative district) in Kętrzyn County, Warmian-Masurian Voivodeship, in northern Poland. Its seat is the town of Kętrzyn, although the town is not part of the territory of the gmina.

Villages
Gmina Kętrzyn contains the villages and settlements of: 
 
 Bałowo
 Bałtrucie
 Banaszki
 Biedaszki
 Biedaszki Małe
 Brzeźnica
 Cegielnia
 Czerniki
 Dąbrowa
 Działki
 Filipówka
 Gałwuny
 Gierłoż
 Gnatowo
 Gnatowo-Kolonia
 Godzikowo
 Góry
 Grabno
 Gromki
 Gryzławki
 Henrykowo
 Jankowo
 Jeżewo
 Karolewo
 Kaskajmy
 Katkajmy
 Koczarki
 Kotkowo
 Kruszewiec
 Kwiedzina
 Langanki
 Łazdoje
 Linkowo
 Marszewo
 Martiany
 Mażany
 Muławki
 Muławki-Dwór
 Nakomiady
 Nowa Różanka
 Nowa Wieś Kętrzyńska
 Nowa Wieś Mała
 Nowy Mikielnik
 Nowy Młyn
 Olchowo
 Osewo
 Ostry Róg
 Owczarki
 Owczarnia
 Parcz
 Poganówko
 Poganowo
 Porębek
 Pożarki
 Pręgowo
 Przeczniak
 Rybniki
 Salpik
 Sławkowo
 Smokowo
 Stachowizna
 Stadniki
 Stara Różanka
 Strzyże
 Suchodoły
 Sykstyny
 Trzy Lipy
 Ugiertowo
 Wajsznory
 Wilamowo
 Wilkowo
 Windykajmy
 Wólka
 Wopławki
 Wymiarki
 Zalesie Kętrzyńskie

Neighbouring gminas
Gmina Kętrzyn is bordered by the town of Kętrzyn and by the gminas of Barciany, Giżycko, Korsze, Mrągowo, Reszel, Ryn, Srokowo and Węgorzewo.

References
 Polish official population figures 2006

Ketrzyn
Kętrzyn County

de:Kętrzyn#Landgemeinde